Kim A-lang (Hangul: 김아랑, born 22 August 1995) is a South Korean short track speed skater. Kim made her debut on the international stage with two gold medals and one silver medal at the 2013 World Junior Short Track Speed Skating Championships, placing second in the overall ranking. Kim was part of the short track speed skating team in the 3000 m relay that won a gold medal at the 2014 Winter Olympics. Four years later, she won another gold in the relay at the 2018 Winter Olympics.

Personal life
Kim, who was born in Jeonju, went to the skating rink along with her brother during elementary school.

In 2022, Kim signs a contract with Sandbox for YouTube activities.

Filmography

Television shows

References

External links

1995 births
Living people
People from Jeonju
South Korean female short track speed skaters
Short track speed skaters at the 2014 Winter Olympics
Short track speed skaters at the 2018 Winter Olympics
Short track speed skaters at the 2022 Winter Olympics
Olympic short track speed skaters of South Korea
Olympic gold medalists for South Korea
Olympic silver medalists for South Korea
Olympic medalists in short track speed skating
Medalists at the 2014 Winter Olympics
Medalists at the 2018 Winter Olympics
Medalists at the 2022 Winter Olympics
Four Continents Short Track Speed Skating Championships medalists
Universiade medalists in short track speed skating
World Short Track Speed Skating Championships medalists
Universiade gold medalists for South Korea
Universiade silver medalists for South Korea
Universiade bronze medalists for South Korea
Competitors at the 2015 Winter Universiade
Competitors at the 2017 Winter Universiade
Competitors at the 2019 Winter Universiade
Sportspeople from North Jeolla Province
20th-century South Korean women
21st-century South Korean women